
This is a list of aircraft in alphabetical order beginning with 'Ty'.

Ty

Tyler 
(William B Tyler, Detroit, MI)
 Tyler A

Tyndall 
(Joseph E Tyndall, Richmond, VA)
 Tyndall Mr Splinters

References

Further reading

External links 

 List of aircraft (T)